In Flickers is the eleventh studio album by Lycia, released on October 26, 2018 by Projekt Records.

Reception
I Die: You Die gave In Flickers a positive review and said "fans of the band's classic sound should still find plenty to enjoy here – standout "The Path" is a gentle and forlorn strummy elegy that could have been plucked from any of their classic LPs – but the real meat of the record is in the new wrinkles they explore."

Track listing

Personnel 
Adapted from the In Flickers liner notes.

Lycia
 David Galas – vocals, guitars, synthesizer, drum programming, production, recording
 Tara VanFlower – vocals, production, recording
 Mike VanPortfleet – vocals, production, recording, photography

Additional performers
 John Fair – synthesizer, drum programming
 Dirk VanPortfleet – Chau gong

Production and design
 Martin Bowes – mastering

Release history

References

External links 
 
 In Flickers at Bandcamp
 In Flickers at iTunes

2018 albums
Lycia (band) albums
Projekt Records albums